Hadir may refer to:

Sigma Puppis
Hadir, Yemen